Lododdi is a village in Rajavommangi Mandal, Alluri Sitharama Raju district in the state of Andhra Pradesh in India.

Geography 

Demographics 
 India census, Lododdi had a population of 475, out of which 269 were male and 206 were female. The population of children below 6 years of age was 10%. The literacy rate of the village was 52%.

References 

Villages in Rajavommangi mandal